Seerat (previously titled Maria Bint-e-Abdullah) is a 2018 Pakistani television series, produced by Abdullah Kadwani and  Asad Qureshi under their banner 7th Sky Entertainment. The series aired on Geo TV from 19 November 2018 to 29 April 2019. Kinza Hashmi, Ali Ansari and Hamza Firdous play the lead roles.

The series was formerly a biweekly, and was converted into a daily soap to burn off the remaining episodes before Ramadan, due to scheduling conflicts on most Pakistani networks, especially GEO because they telecast a transmission nearly all day, allowing very few dramas to be aired in the month of Ramadan.

Plot 
The protagonist is Maria, whose father is Muslim and mother is Christian. Maria faces discrimination in her aunt and uncle's house due to her mother. The show shows her inclination towards Islam despite the fact that she has spent most of the time with her mother. The story also reflects the lives of her boss Amar, his brother Danish and Danish's would-be wife.

Cast
Ali Ansari as Danish
Kinza Hashmi as Maria 
Hamza Firdous as Ammar
Sukaina Khan as Kanwal
Abid Ali
Mariam Mirza
Rubina Ashraf
Seemi Pasha
Sabiha Hashmi

Soundtrack

The title song "Sada Rab Waris" was sung by Sahir Ali Bagga, who also composed the music.

International release
The serial was dubbed in Arabic under the title ماریہ بنت عبد الله, released on Viu MENA.

References

External links

 

Pakistani drama television series
Comedy-drama television series
Urdu-language television shows
2018 Pakistani television series debuts
Geo TV original programming